Vacancy or No Vacancy may refer to:

Economics
 Vacancy (economics) or job opening, a position offered by a business that wishes to hire a worker
 Vacancy (housing), unoccupied houses in a community

Film and television
 Vacancy (film), a 2007 American horror film
 "Vacancy" (Law & Order: Criminal Intent), an episode of Law & Order: Criminal Intent
 No Vacancy, a fictional rock band in the 2003 film School of Rock
 No Vacancy (1999 film)
 No Vacancy, a 2012 film also known as The Helpers

Music

Albums
 Vacancy (album), a 2016 album by Bayside
 Vacancy (EP), a 1999 EP by Joseph Arthur
 No Vacancy – The Best of The Motels, 1990 compilation album by The Motels

Songs
 "Vacancy" (song), a 2008 single by a Japanese-American singer Kylee
 "Vacancy", by Joseph Arthur from Vacancy 
 "Vacancy", by Neil Young from unreleased album Homegrown
 "Vacancy", by Harry Chapin from Verities & Balderdash 
 "No Vacancy" (Merle Travis song), 1946 song by Merle Travis and Cliffie Stone
 "No Vacancy" (OneRepublic song), 2017 song by OneRepublic

Other uses
 Vacancy defect, a type of point defect in a crystal

See also

 Casual vacancy (disambiguation)
Vacancy 2: The First Cut, a 2009 American direct-to-video film
Papal vacancy, vacancy caused by the death or resignation of a pope